Usha Naik is an Indian actress who works in Marathi films. She started her career as a background dancer in films.

Filmography

Films
 Samna (1974)
 Kalavantin (1978)
 Banya Bapu  (1977)
 Duniya Kari Salaam  (1979)
 Sansar (1980) 
 Aai (1981)
 Bhujang  (1982)
 Don Bayka Fajiti Aika  (1982)
 Galli Te Dilli  (1982)
 Jagavegali Prem Kahani  (1984)
 Gaon Tasa Changala Pan Veshila Tangala (1985)
 Dekha Pyar Tumhara  (1985)
 Maaficha Sakshidar  (1986)
 Aandhala Sakshidar  (1991)
 Ek Hota Vidushak  (1992)
 Kaal Ratri Bara Vajata  (2004)
 Ek Hota Viduskhak  (1992)
 Satvapariksha  (1998)
 Nirmala Macchindra Kamble (1999)
 Owalani  (2000)
 Ashi Dnyaneshwari (2001)
 Akalech Kande  (2001)
 Hirva Kunku  (2004)
 Jai Mohata Devi  (2004)
 Halad Tuzi Kunku Maze  (2009)
 Tata Birla Aani Laila (2010)
 Chal Gaja Karu Maja  (2011)
 Ek Hazarachi Note (2014)
 Carry On Maratha (2015)
 Runh (2004)
 Half Ticket (2016)
 Daddy(2017)
 Dhondi(2017)
 Lapachhapi (2017)
Edak: The Goat (2017) 
Bhirkit (2022)

Short Film
 Afternoon Clouds (2017)

Television
 Swapnanchya Palikadle (2013)
 Jago Mohan Pyaare (2017-2018)
 Phulala Sugandha Maticha (2021)
 Nima Denzongpa (2021-2022)

See also
Marathi cinema

References

External links
 

Actresses from Mumbai
Indian film actresses
Actresses in Marathi cinema
20th-century Indian actresses
21st-century Indian actresses
Living people
Year of birth missing (living people)